"Till I Die" is a song by American rapper Machine Gun Kelly. The song premiered via YouTube, on January 5, 2015 and was released in the US on January 6, as the lead single from Machine Gun Kelly's sophomore studio album, General Admission. It contains references to artists from Cleveland, as well as to the life in the state of Ohio. The song received positive reviews, with critics praising MGK's lyrical ability and inert references to Cleveland, describing the song as a "perfect trap anthem". The song was produced by J.U.S.T.I.C.E. League when the song was recorded in 2014, and the group also handled the distribution of the song.

Sequel
A sequel for the single was released, known as Till I Die: Part II, and featured fellow Cleveland based hip-hop group Bone Thugs-n-Harmony and rappers French Montana, Yo Gotti and Ray Cash.

Music video
The video was directed by Casey McPerry and MGK himself, filmed in Cleveland, Ohio and premiered on MGK's VEVO on January 5, 2015. The video depicts MGK rapping to his hometown and Cleveland rapper , as well as MGK's daughter, made cameo appearances in the video. The music video on YouTube has over 103 million views.

A music video for the sequel was released on WorldStarHipHop on June 4, 2015 and amassed over 4 million views on the content aggregator site.

In popular culture
The song has been used as walkout music for UFC fighter Stipe Miocic since 2015. Miocic chose the song due to the two men's shared Cleveland heritage.
A new version of the song is featured on the soundtrack for NBA 2K16.

Charts

Certifications

References

External links
Lyrics of this song at Genius

2015 singles
2015 songs
Machine Gun Kelly (musician) songs
Bad Boy Records singles
Interscope Records singles
Songs written by Machine Gun Kelly (musician)
Song recordings produced by J.U.S.T.I.C.E. League
Songs written by Erik Ortiz